The R391 is a Regional Route in South Africa that connects Burgersdorp with Hofmeyr. It is co-signed with the R56 for nine kilometres.

Passes on the R391
 Groot-Doringhoek Pass

External links
 Routes Travel Info

References

Regional Routes in the Eastern Cape